Ipasha Glacier is located in the US state of Montana in Glacier National Park. Melt water from the glacier flows over Ipasha Falls en route to Ipasha Lake.

See also
 List of glaciers in the United States
 Glaciers in Glacier National Park (U.S.)

References

Glaciers of Glacier County, Montana
Glaciers of Glacier National Park (U.S.)
Glaciers of Montana